Gamochaeta sphacelata, the owl's crown, is a species of flowering plant in the family Asteraceae. It is widespread across South America, Central America, and Mexico with the distribution just barely crossing the Río Grande into western Texas.

The plant forms many small flower heads in elongated arrays. Each head contains 3–5 purple disc flowers but no ray flowers.

References

sphacelata
Flora of Central America
Flora of South America
Flora of Mexico
Flora of Texas
Plants described in 1818
Taxa named by Carl Sigismund Kunth
Taxa named by Ángel Lulio Cabrera